This is a list of holidays in Palau.

List

References

Holidays
Palau
Palau